Alena Neumiarzhitskaya (born 27 July 1980) is a Belarusian sprinter.

Neumiarzhitskaya won a bronze medal in 4 x 100 metres relay at the 2005 World Championships in Athletics together with Yulia Nestsiarenka, Natallia Solohub and Aksana Drahun. At the 2006 European Athletics Championships in Gothenburg she won a bronze medal in 4 × 100 m relay with Nestsiarenka, Natallia Safronnikava and Drahun.

Personal bests
 100 metres – 11.05 s (2010)
 200 metres – 22.99 s (2006)

External links
 

1980 births
Living people
Belarusian female sprinters
Athletes (track and field) at the 2004 Summer Olympics
Athletes (track and field) at the 2012 Summer Olympics
Olympic athletes of Belarus
World Athletics Championships medalists
European Athletics Championships medalists